Paul J. Nahin (born November 26, 1940 in Orange County, California) is an American electrical engineer and author who has written 20 books on topics in physics and mathematics, including biographies of Oliver Heaviside, George Boole, and Claude Shannon, books on mathematical concepts such as Euler's formula and the imaginary unit, and a number of books on the physics and philosophical puzzles of time travel.

Born in California, he graduated from Brea Olinda High School in 1958, and thereafter received a B.S. from Stanford University in 1962, an M.S. from the California Institute of Technology in 1963, and a Ph.D. from the University of California, Irvine in 1972, all in electrical engineering.

He thereafter taught at Harvey Mudd College, the University of Virginia, and the Naval Postgraduate School in Monterey, California.
, Nahin was an emeritus professor of electrical engineering at the University of New Hampshire. 

Nahin received the 2017 Chandler Davis Prize for Excellence in Expository Writing in Mathematics and, in 1979, the first Harry Rowe Mimno writing award from the IEEE Areospace and Electronic Systems Society.

He married Patricia A. Telepka in 1962.

Works

 Hot Molecules, Cold Electrons: From the Mathematics of Heat to the Development of the Trans-Atlantic Telegraph (2020)
 Transients for Electrical Engineers: Elementary Switched-Circuit Analysis in the Time and Laplace Transform Domains (with a touch of MATLAB®) (2018)
 How to Fall Slower Than Gravity: And Other Everyday (and Not So Everyday) Uses of Mathematics and Physical Reasoning (2018)
 In Praise of Simple Physics: The Science and Mathematics behind Everyday Questions (2016)
 Inside Interesting Integrals (2014); pbk edition
 Holy Sci-Fi!: Where Science Fiction and Religion Intersect (2014)
 Will You Be Alive in 10 Years?: And Numerous Other Curious Questions in Probability (2014)
 The Logician and the Engineer: How George Boole and Claude Shannon Created the Information Age (2012); 2017 pbk edition
 When Least Is Best: How Mathematicians Discovered Many Clever Ways to Make Things as Small (or as Large) as Possible (2011);
 Number-Crunching: Taming Unruly Computational Problems from Mathematical Physics to Science Fiction (2011)
 Dr. Euler's Fabulous Formula: Cures Many Mathematical Ills (2011) 2017 pbk edition
 Digital dice: computational solutions to practical probability problems (2008); 2013 pbk edition
 Time Travel: A Writer's Guide to the Real Science of Plausible Time Travel (1997); 2011 pbk edition
 Mrs. Perkins's Electric Quilt: And Other Intriguing Stories of Mathematical Physics (2009)
 Chases and Escapes: The Mathematics of Pursuit and Evasion (2007; reprinted in paperback 2012)
 Time Machines: Time Travel in Physics, Metaphysics, and Science Fiction (2001)
 The Science of Radio: With MATLAB and Electronics Workbench Demonstrations, 2nd Edition (2001)
 Duelling Idiots and Other Probability Puzzlers (2000); 2012 pbk edition
 Oliver Heaviside: Sage in Solitude : The Life, Work, and Times of an Electrical Genius of the Victorian Age (1988)Robert Rosenberg (1989) Isis.Jed Buchwald (1991) Centaurus.  2002 pbk edition

References

External links
Paul J. Nahin biography at Amazon.com''

1940 births
Living people
Engineers from California
Mathematics popularizers
Stanford University alumni
California Institute of Technology alumni
University of California, Irvine alumni
American electrical engineers
20th-century American engineers
21st-century American engineers